Stackhousia minima is a perennial herb species in the family Celastraceae. It is native to New Zealand.

References
 New Zealand Plant Conservation Network, Stackhousia minima, accessed 2010-10-04.

Stackhousia
Flora of New Zealand